Ugly Betty Thailand is a Thai comedy-drama television series. The series is based on Fernando Gaitán's Colombian telenovela Yo soy Betty, la fea, which has had many other international adaptations. It aired on Monday nights on Thairath TV starting March 9, ending September 7 in 2015. It's the first TV series of the Thairath TV channel.

Plot 
A story of Pet (meaning 'Duck' in Thai) (Pratchayanan "Babymind" Suwanmani), a young girl who looks ugly but is very capable. She works as a secretary for Danai (Wasin "Ko" Atsawanaruenat), who is a young playboy and the son of Bodin Phriamit (Suchao Phongwilai), CEO of POSH Inc., a high-end cosmetics company and Ngamkhae Phriamit (Nicole "Nikki" Theriault).

Danai is the new CEO but things are not as they seem, because Danai has competition from the managing director Alisa "Alice" Phalakon (Sonia "Pim" Couling) and the Phalakon family who holds shares of his company, Pet also has problems resulting from Amita "Am" Phuengthanin (Sukhonthawa "Mai" Koetnimit), Danai's previous secretary and Mesa "May" Phalakon (Onnicha  "Jenny" Akkharasewaya), Danai's love interest.

Cast

References

External links 
 The Ugly Duckling on IMDB
 Ugly Betty Thailand  on Mydramalist.info

Thai romantic comedy television series
2010s Thai television series
2015 Thai television series debuts
2015 Thai television series endings
Television shows set in Bangkok
2010s workplace comedy television series
2010s workplace drama television series
Comedy-drama television series
Yo soy Betty, la fea